The City of Newton, Massachusetts consists of thirteen officially recognized villages. Like most Massachusetts villages, the villages of Newton do not have any legal representation, and exist mostly for cultural reasons. Most Newtonian villages contain a downtown center, a post office, and a unique zip code.

Recognized 

 Auburndale — centered on the intersection of Commonwealth Avenue and Auburn Street
 Chestnut Hill — includes Boston College, and spills over into Boston and Brookline
 Newton Centre — centered on the intersections of Centre Street, Beacon Street and Langley Road 
 Newton Corner — centered on the intersection of Centre Street, Washington Street and the Massachusetts Turnpike
 Newton Highlands — centered on the intersections of Centre Street, Walnut Street and Lincoln Street
 Newton Lower Falls — the only Village located largely outside of Massachusetts Route 128
 Newton Upper Falls — centered on the intersection of Eliot Street and Chestnut Street
 Newtonville — centered on the intersection of Walnut Street and Washington Street
 Nonantum — centered on the intersection of Adams Street and Watertown Street
 Oak Hill — the southernmost Village, bisected by Dedham Street
 Thompsonville — centered on the intersection of Boylston Street and Langley Road
 Waban — centered on the intersection of Beacon Street and Woodward Street
 West Newton — centered on the intersections of Chestnut Street, Waltham Street, Watertown Street and Washington Street

Unofficial 
 Four Corners — centered on the intersection of Beacon Street and Walnut Street, not always recognized by the City of Newton as an official village
 Oak Hill Park — a residential development sometimes marked as part of Oak Hill but recognized as a village on certain city documents

References 

 
Villages in Newton